The National Organization of Russian Muslims (NORM) is an organization of the Russian Muslims, founded in 2004 on the basis of Russian Muslim communities of Moscow (Banu Zulkarnain), Yoshkar-Ola (Tsaryovokokshaysk Community of Russian Muslims), Omsk and Almaty.

History
On 11–13 June 2004 in Omsk the first founding congress was held with the initiative of Vadim Sidorov (Harun ar-Rusi). Abu Talib (Anatoliy Stepchenko) from Omsk, who converted to Islam in 1990, was elected as a chairman.

In 2005 the Russian Muslims’ communities of Saint-Petersburg and Rostov-on-Don also merged with THE NORM. The members of the Organization created the Cultural-educational center “Proponents of Tradition and Unity”, which aimed to increase Dawah among ethnic Russians and interactions with other ethnic-national Muslim communities.

There was a shift from acute controversy to cooperation with the former priest of Russian Orthodox Church, now well-known Islamic scholar Vyacheslav Polosin.

At the same time the interactions with Geydar Dzhemal, whom the opponents of the Organization were usually referring as the founder of the NORM, were stopped.

In 2006 in the next congress of the NORM it was decided that Shias cannot be members of the Organization and it was offered to all Shia members to accept Orthodox Islam or to leave the Organization. No exceptions were made even for some executives of the NORM. It was decided to transfer the infrastructure of the Cultural-educational center “Proponents of Tradition and Unity”, to Azerbaijani Sunni community.

In 2007 there was the first contact between the NORM and Murabitun World Movement and its leader Abdalqadir as-Sufi. The representatives of the NORM visited Cape Town. In 2007 Russian Muslims’ community of Kirov also entered to the Organization.

Until 2008 the NORM was the proponent of the Salafi theology. In 2008 it was decided to shift to the classical Ashari School of Theology and Maliki madhab. The contacts with the Murabitun World Movement were widened. The leaders of the German and Spanish Muslim communities visited Moscow. Some changes were made in the Articles of association of the Organization — individual membership to the NORM changed to the collective membership.

In 2010 the delegation of the NORM took part in the Musamma (annual conference) of the Abdalqadir as-Sufi’s students in Cape Town, also held Shura (Conference) there. Some changes were made in the National Council of the NORM.

In 2011 the Organization became an international NGO. All activity in the previous format was stopped. Some communities, leaders and members of the NORM took part in Russian Islamic Movement.

In 2012 communities of the NORM in Moscow and Saint-Petersburg actively took part in Russian opposition protests.

Despite the effort of some opponents to link the activity of the NORM to the extremist activity of some newly converted Russian Muslims, the National Organization of Russian Muslims, its leaders and members have never been accused of extremism, never been sued or wanted for such allegations.

NORM positions itself as a base for creation of a new sub-ethnic group — Russian Muslims.

References

Islamic organizations based in Russia
2004 establishments in Russia
Islamic organizations established in 2004